The 1991 All-Ireland Under-21 Football Championship was the 28th staging of the All-Ireland Under-21 Football Championship since its establishment by the Gaelic Athletic Association in 1964.

Kerry entered the championship as defending champions.

On 12 May 1991, Tyrone won the championship following a 4-16 to 1-5 defeat of Kerry in the All-Ireland final. This was their first All-Ireland title.

Results

All-Ireland Under-21 Football Championship

Semi-finals

Final

Statistics

Miscellaneous

 The All-Ireland semi-finals see two first-time pairings as Tyrone and Leitrim, as well as Kerry and Meath meet for the first time in the championship.

References

1991
All-Ireland Under-21 Football Championship